Julian Kornhauser (born 20 September 1946 in Gliwice, Poland) is a Polish poet and literary critic.

He was born to a Jewish father and a Catholic mother, as a son of Jakub and Małgorzata Kornhauser. He is an author of poems, novels and literary sketches. He also published translations of Serbian and Croatian poetry. At present, he works as a professor at the Jagiellonian University in Kraków. Through his daughter Agata Kornhauser-Duda, his son-in-law is Andrzej Duda, President of Poland for the Law and Justice party.

References
”On Been and Gone”

1946 births
People from Gliwice
Jewish Polish writers
Polish male poets
Polish literary critics
Polish people of Jewish descent
20th-century Polish male writers
Living people
Academic staff of Jagiellonian University
Polish translators
20th-century Polish poets